The Studio Building is a nine-story building in downtown Portland, Oregon. Built in 1927 by the Ellison-White Conservatory of Music, along with the attached Guild Theatre, the building originally had 128 studios for actors and musicians. The exterior displays busts of famous composers. The street level is occupied by the restaurant Pastini, as of 2010.

References

External links
 
 Studio Building at Emporis

1927 establishments in Oregon
Buildings and structures completed in 1927
Buildings and structures in Portland, Oregon
Southwest Portland, Oregon